Eric's Tales of the Sea is a one-man stage performance by "Eric" which has been presented in the United Kingdom and Australia at Fringe festivals, comedy festivals and special events. During the show, Eric discusses his experiences as a submariner and member of the Royal Navy with the audience, within the limitations of the Official Secrets Act. In 2009, The Guardian described the show as a "compendium of extraordinary naval yarns" which includes encounters with sharks and near-death experiences during submarine escape training and exercises. In 2012 the show played at the Edinburgh Fringe. In 2016 and 2017 the show played at the Adelaide Fringe Festival and included projected photographs from Eric's naval career and occasional diagrams and quotations.

References 

Naval history